Dale Ishimoto (April 3, 1923 – March 4, 2004) was an American actor of Japanese descent. He was born in Delta, Colorado in 1923 and was raised in Guadalupe, California.

Military service
After being sent to the Gila River internment camp in Arizona, Ishimoto volunteered to fight in World War II, joining the 442nd Regimental Combat Team.  After two years, he was awarded a Purple Heart and given a medical discharge.

Entertainment career
After starting a business in Chicago, he moved back to California, where he grew up, and started his acting career by acting at the Altadena Playhouse. He became a "familiar figure" for playing "villainous Japanese soldiers".

Over the course of his career, he acted in a wide variety of movies, such as a Japanese army captain in Beach Red (1967), a Korean doctor in MASH (1970), a karate instructor in Superchick (1973), and as Vice Admiral Boshiro Hosogaya in Midway (1976).

He became known in the late 1990s for his appearances in television commercials for Nissan in which he portrayed Yutaka Katayama, the company's former president. He also appeared in one episode of Wanted: Dead or Alive.

Personal life
Ishimoto married Miiko Taka in Baltimore in 1944, and they had two children: a son and a daughter.  They divorced in 1958.

Filmography

The King and I (1956) - Crewman (uncredited)
Tokyo After Dark (1959) - Reporter (uncredited)
Battle of the Coral Sea (1959) - Japanese Guard (uncredited)
Never So Few (1959) - Scout (uncredited)
The Wackiest Ship in the Army (1960) - Japanese Pilot (uncredited)
The Great Impostor (1961) - Korean Soldier (uncredited)
Operation Bottleneck (1961) - Matsu
Battle at Bloody Beach (1961) - Blanco
A Majority of One (1961) - Taxi Driver (uncredited)
Sea Hunt (1961) - Season 4, Episode 17
The Nun and the Sergeant (1962) - Pak
PT 109 (1963) - Commander (uncredited)
McHale's Navy (1964) - Japanese Captain
Moro Witch Doctor (1964) - Manuel Romblon
King Rat (1965) - Yoshima
Walk, Don't Run (1966) - Plainclothesman (uncredited)
The Sweet and the Bitter (1967) - Dick Kazanami
Beach Red (1967) - Captain Tanaka
MASH (1970) - Korean Doctor (uncredited)
The Games (1970) - Japanese Doctor
Superchick (1973) - Karate Instructor
When the North Wind Blows (1974) - Yermak
Sharks' Treasure (1975) - Ishi
Midway (1976) - Vice Admiral Boshiro Hosogaya
Enter the Ninja (1981) - Komori
Cracking Up (1983) - Japanese Mechanic
Cannonball Run II (1984) - Japanese Businessman (uncredited)
Ninja III: The Domination (1984) - Okuda
Come See the Paradise (1990) - Mr. Ogata
Beverly Hills Ninja (1997) - Old Japanese Man
Inconceivable (1998) - Mr. Akiyama (final film role)

Selected Television

References

External links

1923 births
2004 deaths
20th-century American male actors
American male actors of Japanese descent
American male television actors
American male film actors
American film actors of Asian descent
American military personnel of Japanese descent
Japanese-American internees
Military personnel from Colorado
People from Delta, Colorado
United States Army personnel of World War II
United States Army soldiers